Avgury is an old and rare Russian male first name. It is derived from the Latin word augur, meaning a priest who interpreted the will of the gods by studying the flight of birds; itself derived from the word avis, meaning bird.

The patronymics derived from this first name are "" (Avguriyevich; masculine) and "" (Avguriyevna; feminine).

References

Notes

Sources
Н. А. Петровский (N. A. Petrovsky). "Словарь русских личных имён" (Dictionary of Russian First Names). ООО Издательство "АСТ". Москва, 2005. 

Russian masculine given names